Juan Gilberto Núñez Castillo (born 26 March 1986) is a Colombian footballer who plays for Deportivo Pereira in the Categoría Primera B. He can play as a midfielder or striker.

Club career
On 14 July 2015, he completed a move to China with Harbin Yiteng F.C.

International career
Núñez played with the Colombia national under-17 football team at the 2003 South American Youth Championship, which Colombia hosted made it to the semi-final.

Notes

External links

1986 births
Living people
Footballers from Cali
Colombian footballers
Colombia youth international footballers
Deportes Quindío footballers
Atlético Huila footballers
Boyacá Chicó F.C. footballers
La Equidad footballers
Atlético Junior footballers
América de Cali footballers
Zhejiang Yiteng F.C. players
Categoría Primera A players
China League One players
Colombian expatriate footballers
Expatriate footballers in China
Association football forwards